Snehana Preethina is a 2007 Indian Kannada-language film directed by Shahuraj Shindhe, and is a remake of the 1997 Hindi film, Ishq. It stars Darshan, Aditya, Sindhu Tolani and Lakshmi Rai.

Plot
Soorya (Darshan) and Adi (Aditya) are two close friends. Soorya is a poor youngster who falls in love with Lakshmi (Lakshmi Rai), daughter of a rich man, Rajeev Kumar (Rajeev). Meanwhile, Adi, son of a rich man, Raghunath Rao (Rangayana Raghu) falls in love with a poor girl, Sindhu (Sindhu Tolani). This is not acceptable to the rich fathers, Rajeev Kumar and Raghunath Rao. They devise a plot to separate the lovers and want Adi to marry Lakshmi. Ignorant of the crooked plans of their parents, Adi and Lakshmi finally agree to marry each other. Who marries whom? What happens to the close friendship between Soorya and Adi?

Cast
 Darshan as Surya
 Aditya as Adi
 Sindhu Tolani as Sindhu
 Lakshmi Rai as Lakshmi
 Jennifer Kotwal 
 Rangayana Raghu as Raghunath Rao
 Rajeev as Rajeev Kumar
 Sadhu Kokila
 Abhijeeth
 Mukhyamantri Chandru
 Doddanna
 Sundar Raj
 Tennis Krishna
 Sathyajith
 Ramesh Bhat
 Siddarth
 Gazar Khan

Soundtrack

V. Harikrishna composed music for the soundtracks and the lyrics were written by V. Nagendra Prasad. The album consists of six soundtracks.

References

External links
 
Darshan, Auditya take up Aamir, Ajay's roles Rediff.com
2007 films
2000s Kannada-language films
2007 romantic comedy films
Kannada remakes of Hindi films
Films scored by V. Harikrishna
Indian romantic comedy films